Hilltops is an Australian Geographical Indication for a wine region in the Southern New South Wales zone of the state of New South Wales in Australia. It includes the main towns of Boorowa, Harden and Young.

The region has  of vineyards, planted predominantly to red wine grapes. The vineyards are over  altitude, in dark red granitic clay with basalt.

Grove Estate Wines is one of the notable wineries in the region and famous for its Nebbiolo, Cabernet Sauvignon and Cellar Block Shiraz.

References

1998 introductions
Wine regions of New South Wales

External links
 Hilltops Region Tourism Website